Susan Clark (born Nora Golding; March 8, 1943) is a Canadian actress, known for her movie roles such as Coogan's Bluff and Colossus: The Forbin Project, and for her role as Katherine Papadopolis on the American television sitcom Webster, on which she appeared with her husband, Alex Karras.

Early life, family and education
Clark was born Nora Golding in Sarnia, Ontario, the daughter of Eleanor Almond (née McNaughton) and George Raymond Golding.

Clark was raised in Toronto, where she attended Northern Secondary School.

Career
In the early 1960s Clark travelled to the UK where she appeared in several television series episodes.

She was employed by Universal Pictures from 1967 where she appeared in several television series and made her feature film debut in Banning.

Clark had leading roles in several Universal films, including Coogan's Bluff with Clint Eastwood in 1968, Tell Them Willie Boy Is Here with Robert Redford in 1969, Valdez Is Coming with Burt Lancaster in 1971, Showdown with Dean Martin in 1973, Night Moves with Gene Hackman in 1975, the disaster film Airport 1975, The Apple Dumpling Gang with Bill Bixby in 1975, and another disaster film, City on Fire, in 1979.

In 1976, she starred in a three-hour made-for-television movie biography of the aviator Amelia Earhart which also covered her marriage to noted publisher G. P. Putnam; she received an Emmy nomination for Best Actress. She posed topless for Playboy in the February 1973 issue pictorial entitled "The Ziegfeld Girls: A dazzling review starring the talking pictures' own Susan Clark".

Clark played Dr. Cleo Markham in Colossus: The Forbin Project, hooker Cherry Forever in Porky's (in which Karras also starred), Elizabeth Murray in Emily of New Moon, Elaine Moore in the television movie Trapped, and Muriel Mulligan in the 1994 television movie Snowbound: The Jim and Jennifer Stolpa Story. She played murderess Beth Chadwick in the Columbo episode "Lady in Waiting".

She starred in the TV movie, Babe, playing multi-sport athlete Babe Didrikson Zaharias. Her performance won her an Emmy in 1976. She and Karras played husband and wife together on the sitcom Webster for six years in the 1980s.

In 2006, Clark appeared at the Manitoba Theatre Centre in the Warehouse production of The Retreat from Moscow, and in the 2007 Mainstage production of The Importance of Being Earnest.

Personal life
She married American football player turned actor Alex Karras in 1980. They met when they co-starred in Babe (and he played her husband, professional wrestler George Zaharias). They later co-starred on the popular primetime sitcom Webster together, portraying husband and wife. Their daughter Katie was born in 1980 as well.

Clark and Karras remained married for 32 years until his death on October 10, 2012.

Filmography

Film

Television

References

External links

1943 births
Canadian film actresses
Canadian television actresses
Living people
Outstanding Performance by a Lead Actress in a Miniseries or Movie Primetime Emmy Award winners
People from Sarnia
Actresses from Ontario
Alumni of RADA